Dead refers to that which has experienced death.

Dead may also refer to:

Arts, entertainment, and media

Music

Artists
 Dead (musician), Per Yngve Ohlin, Swedish black metal vocalist
 Grateful Dead, an American rock band

Albums
 Dead (Obituary album)
 Dead (Young Fathers album)

Songs
 "Dead", by Asking Alexandria from From Death to Destiny (2013)
 "Dead", by Beartooth from Disgusting (2014)
 "Dead", by Converge from Petitioning the Empty Sky (1996)
 "Dead", by Jim Martin from Milk and Blood (1997)
 "Dead", by Korn from Issues (1999)
 "Dead!" by My Chemical Romance from The Black Parade (2006)
 "Dead", by the Pixies from Doolittle (1989)
 "Dead", by They Might Be Giants from Flood (1990)
 "Dead", by Zoé from The Room (2005)

Television
 "Dead" (Law & Order: Criminal Intent), an episode of Law & Order: Criminal Intent

Other uses
 Diethyl azodicarboxylate (DEAD), an organic compound
 Destruction of Enemy Air Defenses (DEAD); see Suppression of Enemy Air Defenses (SEAD)

See also
 
 Dead River (disambiguation)
 Death (disambiguation)
 The Dead (disambiguation)